Klumpfisken ('The Sunfish') is a 2014 Danish film directed by Søren Balle, and written by Balle and Lærke Sanderhoff and features actors Henrik Birch and Susanne Storm.

The film won a Bodil Award for Henrik Birch as "Best Leading Actor" and Susanne Storm as "Best Supporting Actress". And it won a 2015 Robert Award for best adapted screenplay for Søren Balle and Lærke Sanderhoff.

References

External links

2014 comedy films
Danish comedy films
2010s Danish-language films